Patrick or Paddy Dooley may refer to

 Patrick Dooley (politician) (1910–1982),  Irish Fianna Fáil politician
 Patrick Dooley (cricketer) (born 1997), Australian cricketer
 Paddy Dooley (rower) (1926–2008), Irish rower